An Angel from Texas is a 1940 comedy film directed by Ray Enright and written by Fred Niblo Jr. and Bertram Millhauser. The film stars Eddie Albert, Rosemary Lane, Wayne Morris, Ronald Reagan and Jane Wyman. The film was released by Warner Bros. on April 27, 1940.  The film is based on the hit 1925 play The Butter and Egg Man, written by George S. Kaufman.

Plot 
Peter "Tex" Coleman (Eddie Albert), a butter and egg man from Texas, comes to New York with his mother's life savings to buy a hotel in the big city and be near his stage struck sweetheart, Lydia Weston (Rosemary Lane). Upon his arrival, Tex finds Lydia working as a secretary for a couple of fast-talking producers rather than being the stage star that her home town thinks she has become.

Tex is just the angel for whom sharpshooter producers Mac McClure (Wayne Morris) and Marty Allen (Ronald Reagan) have been waiting, because they have a play set for rehearsal but no money to produce it, and their leading lady, Valerie Blayne (Ruth Terry), is adding to their problems by threatening reprisals from her gangster boyfriend, Pooch Davis (Milburn Stone), unless the show opens on schedule. Tex agrees to invest his money in the show if Lydia is given the lead, and when Mac and Marty consent to his terms, the play goes into rehearsal as a drama with two leading ladies.

When Valerie threatens Mac with bodily harm unless she plays the lead, Mac informs Tex that he is going to fire Lydia unless he buys the entire show. Sensing that the play would work as a farce, Marty's wife Marge puts up the money on the condition that Tex play the male lead.

True to Marge's instincts, on opening night, the play has the audience rolling in the aisles as dynamite planted on stage by Valerie's vindictive boyfriend explodes, and the actors' performances are so bad that they are funny. As a comedy, the show becomes a smash success, but when a plagiarism suit looms on the horizon, Tex and Marge sell the show back to its eager producers and leave them holding the bag.

Cast
 Eddie Albert as Peter
 Rosemary Lane as Lydia
 Wayne Morris as Mac
 Ronald Reagan as Marty
 Jane Wyman as Marge
 Ruth Terry as Valerie Blayne
 John Litel as Quigley
 Hobart Cavanaugh as Mr. Robelink
 Ann Shoemaker as Addie Lou Coleman
 Tom Kennedy as Chopper 
 Milburn Stone as 'Pooch' Davis

References

External links
 
 
 
 

1940 films
Warner Bros. films
1940 comedy films
American comedy films
1940s English-language films
American black-and-white films
Films directed by Ray Enright
1940s American films